Leonid Isaakovich Yarmolnik (born January 22, 1954)  is a Soviet and Russian actor and film producer.

Biography
Was born on January 22, 1954, in Grodekovo, Primorsky Krai, where his father, a Soviet Army officer, was stationed. In 1960, Yarmolnik's family relocated to Lviv. Leonid studied at the local music school and was involved in plays at the Lviv Folk Theater. In 1972, he became a student at the Boris Shchukin Theatre Institute and graduated from the acting class of Yury Katin-Yartsev, a famous Russian actor and acclaimed pedagogue of the Vakhtangov Theater Arts School, in 1976. From 1976-1984, he was an actor at the Taganka Theatre. Yarmolnik started his own studio, L-Club, specializing in film distribution, and anchored a TV program with the same name. He was a member of the jury on the popular KVN game show. He was honored with the State Prize of the Russian Federation in 2001 for the role of Zhora in The Barracks.

Personal life

Leonid Yarmolnik is married to Oksana Afanasieva and they have one daughter together. Oksana Afanasieva is a former girlfriend of Soviet singer songwriter Vladimir Vysotsky.

Yarmolnik is Jewish.

Selected filmography

As an actor 
 1979 —  The Very Same Munchhausen (Тот самый Мюнхгаузен) as Theophil von Münchhausen
 1983 —  Look for a Woman (Ищите женщину) as policeman Maximan 
 1984 —  Copper Angel (Медный ангел) as Maurice Barro
 1984 —  TASS Is Authorized to Declare... (ТАСС уполномочен заявить...) as Grechaev
 1987 —  A Man from the Boulevard des Capucines (Человек с бульвара Капуцинов) as one-eyed cowboy Martin
 1988 —  Yolki-palki (Ёлки-палки!) as Grigory Kaigorodov
 1989 —  Private Detective, or Operation Cooperation (Частный детектив, или Операция «Кооперация») as Airliner hijacker
 1989 —  Two Arrows. Stone Age Detective (Две стрелы. Детектив каменного века) as Long-nosed
 1990 —  Passport (Паспорт) as Borya's Israeli friend
 1991 —  Odyssey of Captain Blood (Одиссея капитана Блада) as Levasseur
 1995 —  Heads and Tails as Gosha
 1998 —  Crossroads as Oleg 'Alik' Sevastyanov
 2004 —  My Step Brother Frankenstein as Yulik
 2005 —  The Case of "Dead Souls" as Plyushkin (TV)
 2006 —  Moscow Mission (Обратный отсчёт) as Krot
 2010 —  Love in the Big City 2 (Любовь в большом городе 2) as father of Igor
2011 —  Cars 2 as Miles Axlerod (Russian version)
 2013 —  Hard to Be a God (Трудно быть богом) as Don Rumata
 2016 —   (Ночные стражи) as major Gamayun, head of the secret police Department
 2022 — Woland as Dr. Stravinsky

As a film producer 
 Ku! Kin-dza-dza (2013)

References

External links 
 
 Leonid Yarmolnik. Peoples 
 

1954 births
Living people
Soviet male film actors
Russian male film actors
Soviet male stage actors
Russian male stage actors
Russian film producers
Academicians of the Russian Academy of Cinema Arts and Sciences "Nika"
Civic Platform (Russia) politicians
21st-century Russian politicians
Jewish Russian actors
Russian male voice actors